Cordova Bay is a bay in the Alexander Archipelago of southeast Alaska.  It opens onto Dixon Entrance to the south, between Cape Muzon on Dall Island and Point Marsh (a group of small islets just off Prince of Wales Island). The name Puerto Cordova y Cordova was given by the Spanish explorer Lieutenant Don Jacinto Caamaño in 1792, in honor of Admiral Luis de Córdova y Córdova. The name was published by George Vancouver in 1798.

Cordova Bay is bordered on the west by Dall Island, Long Island, Tlevak Strait, and Sukkwan Island, and on the east by Prince of Wales Island. Cordova Bay extends north and west from its mouth to Lime Point, where it connects with Hetta Inlet. Gould Island almost closes the inlet shortly after it turns east, above this point the inlet is accessible only to small craft. Portage Bay is the portion of the inlet above Gould Island; a portage road (Sulzer Portage) connects it with Cholmondelay Sound.

The Coast Survey does not consider Tlevak Strait (between Sukkwan Island and Dall Island), Hetta Inlet, or Kaigani Strait (between Long Island and Dall Island) to be parts of Cordova Bay, but the Geographic Dictionary of Alaska (1906) included the latter two, and also Sukkwan Strait (north of Sukkwan Island), as parts of the bay. In 2006, the US Supreme Court ruled against a petition by Alaska that would have declared all these waters, including Tlevak Strait, parts of a juridical Cordova Bay. If this petition had been successful it would have put all these waters under state control, rather than the current mix of state and federal jurisdiction.

Cordova Bay and Tlevak Strait provide a sheltered route to Bucareli Bay and other points on the west coast of Prince of Wales Island.  The Coast Guard has estimated that 150 commercial fishing vessels use this route each week during the summer.

The shores of Cordova Bay are a mix of federal land belonging to the Tongass National Forest,  private land (mostly owned by Alaska Native Corporations), and a small amount of state-owned land.  Much of the eastern shore of the bay is part of the South Prince of Wales Wilderness within the National Forest. The shoreline of the northeast part of the bay, around and between Hetta and Klakas inlets, is steep and rocky.  South of Hunter Bay, the Prince of Wales shoreline is more gentle, rising to low rolling hills dotted with lakes.  The other three large islands have a mixture of mountainous terrain and hills, with low-lying land at some places along the shore.

The small city of Hydaburg is situated on the north shore of Sukkwan Strait. It is connected to the Prince-of-Wales road system and provides the only public road access to the bay. It has a harbor and a seaplane base.

Hydaburg was formed in 1911 by consolidation of the three Haida villages on Cordova Bay. These villages were Howkan on the west coast of Long Island, Sukkwan at the northern end of Sukkwan Island, and Klinkwan on Prince of Wales Island at the mouth of Hunter Bay.  Mining, saltery,  and cannery villages on Hetta Inlet, now all abandoned, were Copper City, Hetta, Coppermount, and Sulzer. There were also canneries on Hunter Bay and on Rose Inlet (off of Tlevek Strait).

See also
Orca Bay, Alaska (a branch of Prince William Sound) formerly called Cordova Bay.

References

 Alaska Department of Commerce, Division of community and regional affairs. Alaska Community Database. Hydaburg
 Alaska Department of Natural Resources, Prince of Wales Island Area Plan Amendment (Inclusion of the Southwest Prince of Wales Island Area) Maps 4-7 show land ownership around Cordova Bay.
 Baker, Marcus (1906) "Geographic dictionary of Alaska, ed 2" United States Geological Survey Bulletin 299
 Office of Coast Survey, NOAA (2010) Chapter 6 - Coast Pilot 8 - Edition 32 West Coast of Prince of Wales Island
 Le Cornu, Adrian (1996) "Haida" in Frederick E. Hoxie, ed. Encyclopedia of North American Indians pp 227–228. Houghton Mifflin Harcourt , 
 Rey-Tejerina, Arsenio. Cordova in Alaska Section Other places named Cordova A lecture given at the Cordova Museum in summer of 1990, the bicentennial of the naming of the community. Reprinted at Explore North.
 United States Geological Survey Geographic Names Identification System. Feature Detail Report for: Cordova Bay
 546 US_(2006) Alaska v United States 128 Original. Decree entered January 23, 2006 Report of the Special Master March 2004
 US Coast and Geodetic Survey (1917) United States coast pilot: Alaska. Dixon Entrance to Yakutat Bay, Part 1 Cordova Bay p 95 ff.
 US Forest Service interactive Prince of Wales Recreation Map Brown areas are private land, light green is national forest, dark green is wilderness.
 van den Brink, J.H. (1974) The Haida Indians: cultural change mainly between 1876-1970 Brill Archive. pp 226–228.

External links
 Aerial panorama of Cordova Bay
 US Geological Survey 1908 report including mining (mostly copper) at several sites on Hetta Inlet.
 Bufvers, John (1967) History of Mines and prospects, Ketchikan district, prior to 1952 State of Alaska, Department of Natural Resources, Division of Mines and Minerals. (John Bufvers was a miner and prospector in Alaska 1913–1938. The manuscript was written in 1952 and was published by the Alaska DNR for its historical and mineralogical value. The Hetta Inlet mines are covered on pp 22–25)
  Biographical sketch of William Sulzer, developer of the Jumbo copper mine and namesake of the former village of Sulzer, on Hetta Inlet.
 Coppermount, photograph showing boats and smelter and/or cannery. (Description on the Alaska Digital Archives website says this is a cannery, but University of Washington site  says it is a smelter. The center building looks a lot like another photograph showing the Coppermount smelter and tramway :File:Coppermount.JPG; the other buildings are not identified. The smelter operated 1900–1907.  The Hetta Packing Company opened a cannery at Coppermount in 1921.
 :File:Hetta Lake Hatchery.JPG
 Klinkwan 1892
 Sukkwan
 Sulzer, 1910
 South Prince of Wales Wilderness
 Cordova Bay, B.C., Canada

Alexander Archipelago
Bays of Prince of Wales–Hyder Census Area, Alaska
Bays of Alaska